Emil Q. Javier (born September 11, 1940) is a Filipino plant geneticist and agronomist best known for having served as the 17th President of the University of the Philippines between 1993 and 1999. He was conferred the rank of National Scientist of the Philippines for contributions in Agriculture in August 2019.

Early life and education 
Javier was born in Santa Cruz, Laguna, Philippines. He earned his Ph.D. in Plant Breeding and Genetics from Cornell University, his master's degree from the University of Illinois at Urbana–Champaign and bachelor's degree from the University of the Philippines College of Agriculture (now the University of the Philippines Los Baños).

Career 
Javier spearheaded the elevation the UPCA's Division of Plant Breeding into the UPLB Institute of Plant Breeding, which was approved and given funding under Presidential Decree No. 729 in June 1975, with Javier also serving as the Institute's first director.

Javier served as a presidential cabinet member and chair of the National Science Development Board. He worked at The Hague in the Netherlands as senior research fellow for the International Service for National Agricultural Research and went to Taiwan to direct work on vegetable research and development. After a few years abroad, Javier returned to his country at the request of former President Fidel V. Ramos to lead the University of the Philippines as its president.

References

1940 births
Living people
Cornell University College of Agriculture and Life Sciences alumni
University of Illinois College of Agriculture, Consumer, and Environmental Sciences alumni
People from Laguna (province)
University of the Philippines Los Baños alumni
Presidents of universities and colleges in the Philippines
Filipino expatriates in the United States
National Scientists of the Philippines